Lesbian and Gay is a common term for Homosexuality and LGBT

Lesbian and Gay or Lesbian & Gay may refer to:

Starting with the term
Lesbian and Gay Band Association
Lesbian & Gay Big Apple Corps
Lesbian and Gay Christian Movement
Lesbian and Gay Equality Project
Lesbian & Gay Foundation
Lesbian and Gay Inter-University Organization

Including the term
Canadian Lesbian and Gay Archives
Center for Lesbian and Gay Studies
Children of Lesbians and Gays Everywhere
Families and Friends of Lesbians and Gays
GLQ: A Journal of Lesbian and Gay Studies
London Lesbian and Gay Centre
London Lesbian and Gay Film Festival
National Coalition of Black Lesbians and Gays
National Lesbian and Gay Journalists Association
Norwegian National Association for Lesbian and Gay Liberation
Parents, Families and Friends of Lesbians and Gays
Seattle Lesbian & Gay Film Festival
Tokyo International Lesbian & Gay Film Festival

See also
Gay (disambiguation)
Lesbian (disambiguation)
Gay and Lesbian (disambiguation)